Ojstro is a settlement in the hills immediately east of the town of Trbovlje in central Slovenia. The area is part of the traditional region of Styria. It is now included with the rest of the Municipality  of Trbovlje in the Central Sava Statistical Region.

References

External links
Ojstro on Geopedia

Populated places in the Municipality of Trbovlje